Tyrone Damien Edgar (born 29 March 1982 in Greenwich) is a sprinter from Great Britain who specializes in the 100 metres.

Edgar went to junior college in Kansas, USA in 2003 where he ran an impressive wind assisted (+5.2) 10.04 at the Junior College Championships. He moved to Texas A&M University in the autumn of 2004 and had a breakthrough in 2006 with another wind assisted 10.05 in the NCAA Midwest Championships - Later that summer he earned a place in the Norwich Union GB and NI European Championships Team. Edgar has a degree in leadership and development from Texas A&M and is a qualified fitness instructor.

He competed at the 2004 World Indoor Championships and the 2006 European Championships without reaching the final. In the 4x100 metres relay he won a gold medal at the 2000 World Junior Championships and a silver medal at the 2005 Summer Universiade.

2008 was his most successful year to date. He improved his personal best to 10.06 and, after the controversial disqualification of Dwain Chambers, was selected to compete for Great Britain in the 2008 Summer Olympics. Edgar progressed further than the other two British runners and was eliminated at the semi-final stage after finishing seventh in a time of 10.18 seconds. Following an interview after the race Edgar stated that he felt he belonged in the company of the top sprinters and was now looking to the 2009 World Championships in Berlin. Together with Simeon Williamson, Marlon Devonish and Craig Pickering he also competed at the 4x100 metres relay. In their qualification heat they were disqualified and eliminated.

Edgar suffered a torn hamstring at the Birmingham Games in February 2009, and as a result he missed the Indoor Championships in Turin.

On 22 August 2009, Edgar was a member of The Great Britain and Northern Ireland men’s 4x100m relay team that took bronze at the IAAF World Championships in Berlin with a season’s best of 38.02. Harry Aikines-Aryeetey, Simeon Williamson and Marlon Devonish ran the other legs.

Personal bests

All information taken from IAAF profile.

References 

1982 births
Living people
English male sprinters
Athletes (track and field) at the 2008 Summer Olympics
Olympic athletes of Great Britain
Texas A&M University alumni
Black British sportspeople
World Athletics Championships medalists
Universiade medalists in athletics (track and field)
People from Greenwich
Athletes from London
Universiade silver medalists for Great Britain
Medalists at the 2005 Summer Universiade